Rushton Spencer railway station was a railway station that served the village of Rushton Spencer, Staffordshire. The station was opened by the North Staffordshire Railway in 1849 as part of the Churnet Valley line.

It remained open until passenger services were withdrawn from the northern end of the Churnet valley line ( – ) in 1960.  Freight services lasted until 1964 when they too were withdrawn and the track lifted.  Today the trackbed forms part of the Staffordshire Way.

Route

Notes

References

Disused railway stations in Staffordshire
Railway stations in Great Britain closed in 1960
Railway stations in Great Britain opened in 1849
Former North Staffordshire Railway stations
1849 establishments in England
Grade II listed buildings in Staffordshire
Staffordshire Moorlands